The Large White is a British breed of domestic pig. It derives from the old Yorkshire breed from the county of Yorkshire, in northern England.

History 

First recognised in 1868, the breed is the progenitor of the American Yorkshire in North America.

Characteristics 

The Large White is a big, white pig, with erect ears and a slightly dished face.

Use 

The Large White is one of the most numerous of all pig breeds, widely used in crossbreeding for intensive pig farming around the world.  It was originally developed as an outdoor breed, but today it is one of those favoured by commercial pig breeders, lending uniformity to pigs produced for meat on a large scale.

References 

Pig breeds originating in England